The United Left was an alliance of several leftist opposition groupings in the German Democratic Republic. Among them were Christian socialists, Trotskyists, adherents of the Titoist system of workers' self-management and some Socialist Unity Party of Germany (SED) members, who were critical of their party's policy.

History
Founded on 2 October 1989, only a few weeks before the fall of the Berlin Wall, the United Left demanded a reformation of socialism with the stated goal of creating a free and democratic GDR. At the end of the year 1989 the party had 1500 members with focal points in Berlin and Halle. In contrast to other East German opposition groups, the United Left received less support from Western governments and political parties. Organisational issues and internal tensions between the various ideological factions meant that the United Left only achieved limited political success during its existence.

At the first free elections in the GDR in March 1990, the United Left started together with "" ("The Carnations"), a Marxist party. The electoral alliance with the name "" gained 0.18% of the votes and one seat in the Volkskammer. The United Left fell apart in the years after German reunification, but some members were elected to the Bundestag through a party-list of the PDS or The Greens.

Election results

GDR Parliament (Volkskammer)

References

1989 disestablishments in East Germany
Defunct left-wing political party alliances
Defunct political party alliances in Germany
Defunct socialist parties in Germany
Democracy movements
Democratic socialist parties in Europe
Organizations of the Revolutions of 1989
Peaceful Revolution
Political opposition organizations
Political parties established in 1989
Political parties in East Germany
Germany, East